The Türgesh or Türgish (Old Tibetan: Du-rgyas) were a Turkic tribal confederation. Once belonging to the Duolu wing of the Western Turkic On Oq elites, Türgeshes emerged as an independent power after the demise of the Western Turks and established a khaganate in 699. The Türgesh Khaganate lasted until 766 when the Karluks defeated them. Türgesh and Göktürks were related through marriage.

Name
Atwood (2013), citing Tekin (1968), etymologizes the ethnonym Türgiş as contains gentilic suffix -ş affixed onto the name of lake Türgi-Yarğun, which was mentioned in Kültegin inscription.

Tribal composition
By the 7th century, two or three sub-tribes were recorded: "Yellow" Sarï Türgesh tribe Alishi (阿利施) and the "Black" Qara Türgesh tribe(s) 娑葛 (Suoge < *Soq or *Saqal) - 莫賀 (Mohe < *Bağa). To the Black Türgesh sub-tribe, Chebishi (車鼻施) (*çavïş, from Old Turkic 𐰲𐰉𐰾 *çabïş or Sogdian čapīş "chief"), belonged 8th century Türgesh chor and later khagan Suluk. The Turgesh Khaganate also contained remnants of the Western Turkic Khaganate: Suluk's subordinate Kül-chor belonged to the Duolu tribe Chumukun (處木昆), who lived south of Lake Balkash between Türgesh and Qarluq. Tang general Geshu Han was of Duolu Turgesh extraction and bore the Nushibi tribal surname Geshu (阿舒). Chinese historians, when naming the Duolu Turk tribes, might mention Khalajes along with the Türgesh, under the common appellation 突騎施-賀羅施 (Mand. Tūqíshī-hèluóshī; reconstructed Old Turkic *Türgeş-Qalaç).

A late-7th century Uyghur chief was also surnamed Türgesh.

Timeline

Foundation of the Turgesh Khaganate

Prior to independence, the Turgesh were ruled by a subordinate tutuk, later shad, of the Western Turkic Khaganate's Onoq elites. Turgesh leaders belonged to Duolu division and held the title chur. A Turgesh commander of the Talas district and the town of Balu possessed a name symbolizing some sacred relation to a divine or heavenly sphere. The first Turgesh Kaghan Wuzhile (Chinese transcription 烏質 Wuzhi means "black substance") was a leader of a Manichaean consortium known as yüz er "hundred men". He established the Turgesh Khaganate in 699. He had driven out the Tang protégé Böri Shad. In 703 he captured Suyab and set up his authority on the territory from Chach to Turfan and Beshbaliq. In 706 his son Saqal succeeded him. Both khagans had a church rank of Yuzlik according to Yuri Zuev.

Saqal attacked the Tang city of Qiuci (Kucha) in 708 and inflicted a defeat on the Tang in 709. However Saqal's younger brother Zhenu rebelled and sought military support from the Qapagan Khaghan of the Second Turkic Khaganate in 708. Qapaghan Khagan defeated the Turgesh in 711 in the Battle of Bolchu, and killed both Saqal and Zhenu. The defeated Turgesh fled to Zhetysu. In 714 the Turgesh elected Suluk as their khagan.

Timeline of Suluk

In 720 Turgesh forces led by Kül-chor defeated Umayyad forces led by Sa'id ibn Abdu'l-Aziz near Samarkand.

In 722 Suluk married the Tang Princess Jiaohe.

In 724 Caliph Hisham sent a new governor to Khorasan, Muslim ibn Sa'id, with orders to crush the "Turks" once and for all, but, confronted by Suluk on the so-called "Day of Thirst", Muslim hardly managed to reach Samarkand with a handful of survivors, as the Turgesh raided freely.

In 726 the Turgesh attacked Qiuci (Kucha).

In 727 the Turgesh and the Tibetan Empire attacked Qiuci (Kucha).

In 728 Suluk defeated Umayyad forces while aiding the Sogdians in their rebellion, and took Bukhara.

In 731 the Turgesh were defeated at the Battle of the Defile by the Arabs, who suffered enormous casualties.

In 735 the Turgesh attacked Ting Prefecture (Jimsar County).

In the winter of 737 Suluk, along with his allies al-Harith, Gurak (a Sogdian leader) and men from Usrushana, Tashkent and the Khuttal attacked the Umayyads. He entered Jowzjan, but was defeated by the Umayyad governor Asad at the Battle of Kharistan.

Kül-chor 
 
Following his defeat Suluk was murdered by his relative Kül-chor. Immediately, the Turgesh Khagante was plunged into a civil war between the Black (Kara) and Yellow (Sary) factions. Kül-chor of the Sary Turgesh vanquished his rival Tumoche of the Kara Turgesh. In 740 Kül-chor submitted to the Tang dynasty but rebelled anyway when he killed the Turgesh puppet sent by the Tang court in 742. He was then captured and executed by the Tang in 744. The last Turgesh ruler declared himself a vassal of the recently established Uyghur Khaganate. In 766 the Karluks conquered Zhetysu and ended the Turgesh Khaganate.

Legacy
Tuhsi and Azi might be remnants of the Türgesh, according to Gardizi, as well as Khalaj.<ref>Gumilyov, L. Searches for an Imaginary Kingdom: The trefoil of the Bird's Eye View' Ch. 5: The Shattered Silence (961–1100)</ref>Minorsky, V. "Commentary" on "§17. The Tukhs" in Ḥudūd al'Ālam. Translated and Explained by V. Minorsky. pp. 300–304 The Turgesh-associated tribe Suoge, alongsides Chuyue and Anqing, participated in the ethnogenesis of Shatuo Turks.

According to Baskakov, the ethnonym Türgesh survives in the name of the seok Tirgesh among Altaians.

 List of Türgesh Khagans 

 Wuzhile (699–706)
 Suoge (706–711)
 Suluk (716–738)
 Kut Chor (738–739)
 Kül Chor (739–744)
 El Etmish Kutluk Bilge (744–749)
 Yibo Kutluk Bilge Juzhi (749–751)
 Tengri Ermish (753–755)
 Ata Boyla (750s – 766)

 Notes 

 References 
 Citations 

 Sources 

 
 
 

 
 

 Xue, Zongzheng (薛宗正). (1992). Turkic peoples'' (《突厥史》). Beijing: 中国社会科学出版社. ; OCLC 28622013

 
Turkic peoples of Asia
Khanates
Former countries in Chinese history
699 establishments
Extinct Turkic peoples